As Gaeilge is the eleventh album by Irish folk and rebel band The Wolfe Tones. The title translates as "In Irish" and the album is entirely recorded in the Irish language.

Track list 
 Caoine Cill Cáis
 Sí Finn
 Amhrán Na Breac
 Thugamar Féin An Samhradh Linn
 Brabazons
 Cáit Ní Dhuibhir
 Cuan Bhantraí
 Rosc Catha Na Mumhan
 I Ngarán na Bhfile
 Éamonn an Cnoic
 Siún Ní Dhuibhir
 Tá na Lá
 Reels
 An Dórd Feinne

References

The Wolfe Tones albums
1980 albums
Irish-language albums